The 1990 Malta International Football Tournament  (known as the Rothmans Tournament for sponsorship reasons) was the fifth edition of the Malta International Tournament. The competition was played between 4 and 10 February, with games hosted at the National Stadium in Ta' Qali.

Matches

Winner

Statistics

Goalscorers

See also 
China Cup
Cyprus International Football Tournament

References 

1989–90 in Maltese football
1990 in Icelandic football
1990